Abundance is a 2021 novel by Jakob Guanzon about wealth inequality, and human worth. It is Guanzon's first novel. It covers concepts including inherited medical debt, poverty, food security, criminal justice system, and illegal drug trade. The novel was longlisted for the 2021 National Book Award for Fiction.

References

2021 American novels
2021 debut novels
Graywolf Press books
Works about economic inequality